I-40 Paradise was a 30 minute daily cable TV sitcom on the Nashville Network. The series ran from 1983 to about 1986. The producers made television history by producing an entire episode in a single day. Previous to this, it took an entire week to produce a 30 minute sitcom. each episode also recorded two songs live in stereo with the house band "The Mighty Notes" in the back room of the Paradise, made up of session musicians from across music genres.

Premise
I 40 Paradise was set in a truckstop/restaurant/tavern in the small town of Crab Orchard, Tennessee off of Interstate 40 between Knoxville and Nashville, Tennessee. The main characters included "LuAnn Bledsoe", the owner of the Paradise, played by Barbara George; "Sonny Rollins", the goofy, Goober-style mechanic, played by Bruce Carnahan; "Stogie" the bartender, played by John Ribble; "Georgia", the wannabe-country-music-singer-who-sang-off-key waitress, played by Trish Dougherty; "Buck", the house band leader and resident country music singer, played by Jack Crook; "Randy", Buck's kid brother, a multi-talented singer and musician, played by Lionel Cartwright; and "Melody Dawn Rainey", the girl singer, played by Kelli Warren. After the original pilot aired several regular characters were added. "Calvin," played by Bruce Borin, a shoe salesman, and "Velma" played by Liz Borin, the local beautician and Calvin's girlfriend as well as a character named "Lathrop Wells" who ran the pool hall was also featured on the series played by Mike McElroy.

Guest stars
Country music stars would drop in on their way to Nashville and perform a couple of music numbers on each episode. Many Grand Ole Opry Stars performed on this show, including Reba McEntire, Little Jimmy Dickens, Porter Wagoner, Jerry Clower, Hoyt Axton, Bela Fleck, Tom T Hall and many others. Roy Rogers, star of film and television, also appeared in two episodes. 

Some of the participants went on to greater fame.  Writer J. R. Miller wrote 96 episodes of the 1/2 hour show, including the first. Miller later wrote for the famous comedy show, Hee Haw.  Lionel Cartwright went on to be a famous and successful country music star.

References

External links
 

1980s American sitcoms
1983 American television series debuts
1986 American television series endings
Television shows set in Tennessee
The Nashville Network original programming